Liberté may refer to:

Geography
 Liberté (Paris Métro), a Paris Métro station
 Fort-Liberté, the administrative capital of the Nord-Est department, Haiti
 Liberté (Hong Kong), a project of residential skyscrapers in Cheung Sha Wan, Hong Kong

Ships
 SS Liberté, a French ocean liner known as SS Europa prior to 1950
 Liberté-class battleship, a pre-dreadnought class of battleships of the French Navy
 French battleship Liberté, the lead battleship of the Liberté class, destroyed by explosion in 1911

Books and publications
Liberté (poem), by Paul Éluard 1942
 Liberté (Algeria), a French-language newspaper in Algeria 1992–2022
Liberté, an underground paper of the French Resistance published by François de Menthon
Liberté de Fitchburg, American newspaper

Liberté (Quebec), literary magazine 1959–present
 La Liberté (Canada), Canadian newspaper, Manitoba
 La Liberté (French newspaper), a Paris newspaper 1865–1940
 La Liberté (Switzerland), a Swiss newspaper 1871–present

Film and games
 Liberté (fr), 1939 French film with Maurice Escande playing Auguste Bartholdi, creator of the Statue of Liberty 1937
 Liberté I, a 1962 French film
 Liberté, 2010 French Romani film known in English as Korkoro
 Liberté, a 2001 board game by Martin Wallace
 Freedom (2019 film) (Spanish title Liberté)

Music
Liberté (anthem), the national anthem of Guinea
"O Liberté", aria by Massenet from Le jongleur de Notre-Dame
"Liberté", final section of Poulenc's Figure humaine, setting the Eluard poem

Albums
Liberté, a 1972 album by Les Poppys
Liberté, a 1977 album by Jairo, with the title track a setting of the Eluard poem
Liberté, a 1984 album by Gilbert Montagné
Liberté, a 1984 album by Anne-Marie Nzié
Liberté, a 1987 album by Takako Okamura
Liberté, a 1992 album by Sonia M'barek
Liberté, a 2000 classical album by Grex Vocalis
Liberté (album), a 2009 album by Khaled
Liberté, a 2014 album by Nicolas Kummert
Liberté (The Doobie Brothers album), a 2021 album by the Doobie Brothers

Songs
"Liberté", song by Charles Aznavour and Maurice Vidalin from Aznavour 65
"Liberté", song by Gilles Marchal 1971
"Liberté", song by Anne-Marie Nzié
"Liberté", song by Carla Bruni from Little French Songs
"Liberté" (fr), single setting the Eluard poem by Les Enfoirés for the 2016 charity concert for the Restaurants du Cœur
"La Liberté", song by French singer Tal from Le droit de rêver

Other
 Liberté Inc., a Canadian manufacturer and distributor of dairy and deli foods
Liberté chérie, a 7-member Belgian masonic lodge in World War II

See also
 Liberté, égalité, fraternité, the national motto of France
 Liberty (disambiguation)
 Libert (disambiguation)
 Liebert (disambiguation)